United Nations Security Council resolution 803, adopted unanimously on 28 January 1993, after recalling previous resolutions on the topic including 501 (1982), 508 (1982), 509 (1982) and 520 (1982) as well as studying the report by the Secretary-General on the United Nations Interim Force in Lebanon (UNIFIL) approved in 426 (1978), the Council decided to extend the mandate of UNIFIL for a further six months until 31 July 1993.

The Council then reemphasised the mandate of the Force and requested the Secretary-General to report back on the progress made with regard to the implementation of resolutions 425 (1978) and 426 (1978).

See also 
 List of United Nations Security Council Resolutions 801 to 900 (1993–1994)
 South Lebanon conflict (1985–2000)

References
Text of the Resolution at undocs.org

External links
 

 0803
 0803
South Lebanon conflict (1985–2000)
1993 in Israel
1993 in Lebanon
 0803
January 1993 events